Weigela hortensis is a species of flowering plant in the family Caprifoliaceae, native to Hokkaido and Honshu islands of Japan. A rounded shrub reaching , and hardy in USDA zones 6 through 9, it is occasionally found in commerce.

References

Caprifoliaceae
Endemic flora of Japan
Plants described in 1854